Ixora saulierei is a species of flowering plant in the family Rubiaceae. It is endemic to Tamil Nadu in India.

References

External links
World Checklist of Rubiaceae

saulierei
Flora of Tamil Nadu
Endangered plants
Taxonomy articles created by Polbot